The Federal University of Campina Grande (UFCG) is a public university whose main campus is located in the city of Campina Grande, Paraíba, Brazil. Together with the Federal University of Paraíba, it is the main university of the state of Paraiba, Brazil. Established after splitting from UFPB in 2002, it is one of the leading technological and scientific production institutes of northeastern Brazil, being mentioned in a 2001 edition of the Newsweek magazine as a technopole - among 9 other around the world - that represents a new vision for technology. It was again quoted in 2003 as the Brazilian silicon valley. It is one of the five institutions to have a continuous international concept from the Coordenadoria de Aperfeiçoamento de Pessoal de Nível Superior (grade over 5) in the Electrical Engineering Postgraduate Program, and one of the two to simultaneously hold a concept of 5 stars in the Technological Department (Electrical Engineering and Computer Science) from the Ministry of Education.

History
The Higher Education in the State of Paraiba has its origins in the creation of its first high education school, the Northeastern School of Agronomy, in 1934, in the town of Areia.

In the 1950s, a government initiative called "integration of the technical-industrial development of the State", made Campina Grande a new scientific and cultural center in Paraiba, which made possible the creation of the Polytechnic School - The embryo of the UFCG. It focused on finances and business applied to regional markets. Funding from the government provided the structure and equipment for the  institute, and foreign companies gave endowments.

In 1955, there were eleven Higher education institutes in Paraiba. The Universidade Federal da Paraiba was established in December 1960, by state law nº 1,366. Its federalization was installed by law nº 3,835. In 1973, the university council approved the reform of the academic structure of the institution, in resolution nº 12/73, accordingly with decrees nºs 53 and 252, and law nº 5.540.

In 1963 the Polytechnic school started to offer an Electrical Engineering degree, held by the faculty of the Civil Engineering department. From this year on, there was an influx of professors from the Federal University of Pernambuco (UFPE), and the Aeronautics Technological Institute (ITA) in São Paulo, with whom the university maintained close bonds in the 1960s and 1970s.

In 1967, the UFPB campus in Campina Grande received one of the first supercomputers of Brazil, a US$500,000 IBM mainframe.

The Universidade Federal de Campina Grande was established by law nº 10,419, with its main campus in the city of Campina Grande, and is now composed of the Technological Center, Humanities Center, and Health and Biological Center.

Technopole 
With 64 companies in the area of Information Technology, with a total income of approximately R$27 million a year, the technology sector grows every year in Campina Grande, A reason for the opening of so many enterprises is the quality of higher education in the University of Campina Grande and its major degrees in Electrical Engineering and Computing, as well as the creation of the Technopole of Paraiba Paqtc-PB, which provides financial, institutional and technical support for these new companies.

The UFCG Center of Sciences and Technology - CCT and Center of Electrical Engineering and Computing - CEEI are also responsible for developments in this area. Each year almost half the students graduate in technology fields. Multinational companies like Honda, Fiat, Motorola, Coca-Cola, and Samsung recruit graduates each year. Additionally, those companies and others like Hewlett-Packard, Nokia, Petrobras and Northel, Intel, Sony and Foxconn, have formed partnerships with the institution and provide most of the endowment for installation of new laboratories and funding for research projects.

Awards
In September 2002 the Technopole won the Innovating Project of the year award promoted by the National Society of Technological Enterprises (Amprotec). .
In 2001 it ranked first place in the Banco do Brasil National Social Technology award, and also represented Brazil in the UNESCO headquarters in Paris. .
Mentioned in a 2001 edition of the Newsweek magazine as a technopole - among nine others around the world - that represents a new vision for technology.
List of technopoles chosen by Newsweek:
 Akron, Ohio, U.S.
 Huntsville, Alabama, U.S.
 Oakland, California, U.S.
 Omaha, Nebraska, U.S.
 Tulsa, Oklahoma, U.S.
  Campina Grande, Paraíba, Brazil 
 Barcelona, Spain
 Suzhou, China
 Côte d'Azur, France

Information

Degrees
CEEI
Electrical Engineering
Computer Science
CCBS
Medicine
Psicology
Nursing
CCT
Agricultural Engineering
Civil Engineering
Materials Engineering
Mining Engineering
Mechanical Engineering
Chemical Engineering
Industrial Design
Chemical Technologies
Petroleum Engineering
Meteorology
Physics
Mathematics
CH
Business Administration
Economics
Social Sciences
History
Literature
Philosophy
Geography 
Arts and Media
Pedagogy
CFP
Sciences
Nursing
Geography
History
Literature
Pedagogy
CSTR
Forestal Engineering
Veterinary Medicine
Dentistry
Biology
CCJS
Finances
Law

See also 
 Brazil University Rankings
 Universities and Higher Education in Brazil

References

External links

 
Center of Electrical Engineering and Computing
Electrical Engineering Department
Computing Department

Campina
Education in Paraíba
Educational institutions established in 1934
Buildings and structures in Paraíba
1934 establishments in Brazil
Campina Grande